Megachile mystaceana, the fire-tailed resin bee, is a species of bee in the family Megachilidae. It was described by Charles Duncan Michener in 1962.

References

External links

Mystaceana
Insects described in 1962